The 2000 Kaduna riots were religious riots in Kaduna involving Christians and Muslims over the introduction of sharia law in Kaduna State, Nigeria. It is unclear how many people were killed in the fighting between Muslims and Christians, that lasted with peaceful intervals from 21 February until 23 May 2000; estimates vary from 1,000 to 5,000 deaths.

When in February 2000, the governor of Kaduna announced the introduction of sharia to Kaduna State, of which non-Muslims form almost half of the population, the Kaduna branch of the Christian Association of Nigeria (CAN) organised a public protest against it in Kaduna city. Muslim youths then clashed with them and the situation spiraled out of control, with massive violence and destruction on both sides. The violence happened in two main waves (sometimes referred to as "Sharia 1" and "Sharia 2"): a first wave from 21 to 25 February, with further killings in March, followed by a second wave from 22 to 23 May. The initial violence left more than 1,000 people dead; a judicial commission set up by the Kaduna state government reported the official death toll to be 1,295. However, Human Rights Watch estimated the total number fatalities, including those from March and May and many from February the commission had not counted, to be much higher, somewhere between 2,000 and 5,000. Several media reported a number of about or more than 2,000 deaths (and 2 to 300 deaths in May). Eventually, the army interfered to end the bloody clashes when it became clear the police could not control them.

These became the first so-called "Sharia clashes", the start of the religious riots phase of the Sharia Conflict (1999–present).

See also
 2001 Jos riots
 Miss World riots (2002)
 Yelwa massacre (2004)
 2008 Jos riots
 2010 Jos riots

References

2000 in Nigeria
2000 riots
Kaduna
Religious riots in Nigeria
2000 crimes in Nigeria  
May 2000 events in Nigeria
February 2000 events in Nigeria